Van Saun County Park is a park in Paramus and River Edge, New Jersey operated by the Bergen County Parks Department. The park is home to the Bergen County Zoological Park, open all year round and charging admission from May to October. The zoo features a ridable miniature railroad known as the Safari Express. In addition, the park features picnic areas, a baseball field, a softball field, basketball and tennis courts, a soccer field, a playground, a carousel, and pony rides.

History
The zoo opened in 1960. Its railroad, the Van Saun Park Railroad, was first built in 1963 and features three trains: the 388 train, which accompanied the opening, the 389 train, purchased in 1968, and the 520, added to the lineup in 1971. The train models are Iron Horse S-24  narrow-gauge trains by the Allan Herschell Company. The train is open from Tuesdays through Sundays (weather permitting) and closed Mondays for maintenance, unless it falls on a holiday, between April and October. The train passengers view the many different attractions in the zoo while going through railroad crossings and a tunnel. The train is also open during the Bergen County's Winter Wonderland event, which runs from November through January.

In 2000, a carousel was built, featuring horses and other zoo animals as seats. It is open from April to October every day except Tuesdays for maintenance. It is also open during Bergen County's Winter Wonderland event, which runs from November through January. The carousel has been controversial due to concerns over the owner's lack of insurance. Ever since the Golden Horse Carousel at Paramus Park closed in 2013 and the Venetian Carousel at Garden State Plaza closed in 2016, this carousel at Van Saun Park is the last remaining operating carousel in the entire borough of Paramus.

In addition, pony rides are available at Van Saun Park from April to October. Riders are taken around a small track where the pony is pulled by an employee.

The park has Harmony Playground with a water sprinkler which is open seasonally, and soccer, softball, and baseball fields which are open all year round.

In 2013, Van Saun opened up a dog park, consisting of one area for smaller dogs and another area for larger dogs.

As of 2016, plans were made to expand the zoo, which would nearly double its size from 12 to 23 acres and significantly diversify its population of animal species.

Annual events

The park has some annual events which typically occur in October. The Zoo Boo (sometimes referred to as the Boo at the Zoo) is an event held  around Halloween, including trick-or-treating in the park, ghost stories, and magic shows. The park's train provides evening rides during this event, where actors in costumes try to scare guests.
Also around Halloween is the Metro Howl-O-Ween Bassett Bash, during which many Basset Hounds dress up in different costumes for Halloween and participate in trick-or-treating and contests. It has been held annually since 1997 and is hosted by the Metro Basset Hound Club.
In addition, the Art in the Park event is also held annually in October. Artists are judged on their artwork, with the potential to receive cash prizes. Afterward, there is a concert.

The park also holds events in the winter season, notably Winter Wonderland, an annual event held from November–January with a holiday theme. The event has attractions including an outdoor ice rink, a beer garden, the Santa's North Pole Workshop, and food and drink stands. The trains and carousel are operational during the event if weather permits.
Also in December is the Santa visits the Bergen County Zoo event. Guests can pay a visit to Santa Claus, see the animals open up presents from Santa, and listen to musical holiday performances.

The park holds its own annual Easter Egg Hunt, the Van Saun Park Easter Egg Hunt. Following the egg hunt, there is storytelling and crafts for the children.

Incidents
In 1990, an ocelot seriously injured a boy at the zoo by biting one of his hands. Three years later, another ocelot attacked another boy.

Public transportation
The park provides public transportation from New Jersey Transit bus lines 168 & 752. The 752 does not provide services on Sundays.

Gallery

References

External links
 (Bergen County Zoological Park)

Paramus, New Jersey
Parks in Bergen County, New Jersey
River Edge, New Jersey
Zoos in New Jersey
Tourist attractions in Bergen County, New Jersey
Sports in Bergen County, New Jersey
County parks in New Jersey